The following is a detailed list of Palestinian rocket and mortar attacks on Israel in 2014. All of the attacks originated in the Gaza Strip, unless stated otherwise. For information pertaining to the wider conflict, see Arab–Israeli conflict and Israeli–Palestinian conflict. This list does not include reports of deaths and injuries caused by Hamas rocket and mortar attacks that fell within Gaza.

In total, all the rockets launched on Israel in 2014 resulted in 8 deaths and 60 injuries. All the fatalities occurred during Operation Protective Edge.

On 5 March, the Israeli Navy intercepted a ship containing dozens of long-range rockets being smuggled from Iran to the Gaza Strip.

On 10 March, Hamas, the Palestinian Islamist group that controls the Gaza Strip, unveiled a monument to its rocket attacks on Israeli cities and towns, a life-sized model of an M-75 rocket in Gaza City. The group declared that the attacks "managed to take the battle to the heart of the Zionist entity (Israel)".

On 23 April, Fatah and Hamas signed a reconciliation deal.

In July, the number of rocket attacks launched toward Israel from Gaza increased dramatically. Eighty rockets were fired on 7 July. On the following day, Israel launched Operation Protective Edge.

Summary
This is a partial table that summarises the content of the article below.

January
In January, Palestinians launched 22 rockets and four mortar shell at Israel in 19 separate attacks. Two of the rockets were launched from Sinai.

Press reports however mentioned only these attacks;

January 13
Two rockets were launched to the Northern Negev desert, near Sderot. There were no injuries or damage reported.

January 16
At 2am, five rockets were fired into Israel. The Iron Dome eliminated all rockets, as they would have hit Ashkelon. No injuries or damage were reported.

January 30
A rocket exploded in a non-inhabited area of Sdot Negev Regional Council.  No injuries or damage were reported.

January 31
From the Sinai Peninsula a rocket was launched towards Eilat. The Iron Dome intercepted the rocket. The radical Salafi organization Ansar Bait al-Maqdis took responsibility for the launch.

February
In February, Palestinian launched nine rockets at Israel in seven separate attacks.

Press reports however mentioned only these attacks;

February 6
A Color Red siren alerting residents of a rocket launch from Gaza has been sounded in Ashkelon, followed by an explosion.

A further rocket launched from the Gaza Strip exploded in the Eshkol Regional Council. No injuries or damage were reported.

February 8
A red alert siren sounded in Sha'ar Hanegev and Sdot Negev Regional Councils. A rocket hit an open area in Sha'ar HaNegev. No injuries or damages were reported.

February 10
Palestinians fired a rocket into the Ashkelon Coast Regional Council, triggering sirens. After nightfall, a second rocket was launched into the same area. No injuries or damage were reported. Israel responded with an air strike on an underground rocket launcher in the central Gaza Strip.

February 14
In the evening, Palestinian Militants launched two rockets into Israel. One landed in the Ashkelon Coast Regional Council, the other in the Eshkol Regional Council. No injuries or damage were reported.

March
In March, Palestinians launched 65 rockets and mortar shell, in 23 attacks.

March 1
In the night on Mount Hermon were heard loud blasts. The IDF checked the area and found the remains of two rockets near an IDF outpost. No injuries or damage were reported.

March 3
Mosaab Zaaneen, a 25-year-old militant from Palestinian Islamic Jihad, was killed in an Israeli air strike as he was attempting to launch rockets from Beit Hanoun in the northern Gaza Strip. The Israel Defense Forces stated that the strike "was carried out in order to eliminate an imminent attack targeting civilian communities of southern Israel".

March 5
Palestinians fired a rocket towards the Sha'ar Hanegev Regional Council, triggering sirens in local communities. The projectile landed within the Gaza Strip. Later, after nightfall, a second rocket was fired at Sderot. No injuries or damage were reported in either attack.

March 11
After nightfall, Palestinians fired a rocket into the Sha'ar Hanegev Regional Council. The projectile landed in an open area, causing no injuries or damage.

March 12–14
Palestinian Islamic Jihad Militants fired at least 60 rockets at Israeli cities and towns, in the heaviest barrage since 2012. No direct injuries were reported, but a 57-year-old woman was lightly injured while taking cover in Sderot. At least eight rockets fell within communities, with one exploding near a gas station and another near a public library. Explosions rocked the cities of Sderot and Netivot, and sirens sounded as far away as Beersheba.

April
In April, There were 19 rockets and 5 mortar shell in 14 attacks towards Israel. These attacks caused property damage, but no deaths or injuries.

April 1
Residents heard massive detonations. Three rockets were fired at Eilat, which were intercepted by the Iron Dome.

April 3
The "Code Red" siren was heard 3 times in a row in the evening. No rocket landing were identified, therefore the rockets came down within Gaza.

April 4
In the Hof Ashkelon Regional Council a rocket exploded in the open area, close to the border fence. No injuries or damage were reported.

April 5
Militants in Gaza fired a rocket into Israel. No injuries or damage were reported.

April 6
In the Sha'ar HaNegev Regional Council, near a kibbuz, was heard an explosion of a mortar shell. No red alert siren sounded before. No one was hurt, no damage reported.

April 9
In the early afternoon a Color Red siren alerting residents of a rocket launch from Gaza has been sounded in Hof Ashkelon Regional Council. The rocket came down within the Gaza strip.
Later in the evening a mortar rocket hit a kibbutz in the Sha'ar Hanegev Regional Council. It caused material damage, but no one was injured. No Red Siren sounded prior to the rockets landing.

April 13
Very early in the morning a mortar shell exploded close to the security fence in the open field, prior to a "red alert".
In the late night two more mortars were launched targeting Israeli soldiers, operating at the security fence in the Southern Gaza area. No one got injured.

April 16
In the night, Militants launched several rockets at Southern Israel. No injuries or damage were reported.

April 21
Militants in Gaza fired seven rockets into Israel during the last day of the Passover holiday. The first three projectiles struck uninhabited areas in the Sha'ar Hanegev Regional Council, activating "Code Red" sirens. No damage was reported in the attack. Another two rockets caused light damage in Sderot. Israel responded by striking three terrorist targets in the Gaza Strip.

April 23
3 rockets were fired from Gaza at the Hof Ashkelon and Sha'ar HaNegev Regional Councils, after rocket alert sirens sounded. No injuries were reported.

April 24
A mortar shell exploded near the fence in Southern Gaza. Later in the day explosive device exploded near IDF force at the Northern Gaza border. No injuries or damage were reported

May
Throughout May 4 rockets and 3 mortar shells were launched from Gaza in 5 attacks towards Israel.

May 1
A rocket hit an open area in Eshkol. No one were hurt, no damage was reported.

May 21
Several mortar rounds were fired at IDF forces on the Gaza border. No injuries, damages in attack.

May 23
A rocket exploded in open field in Sha'ar HaNegev Regional Council. No reports of damages or injuries.

June

Throughout June about 62  rockets and 3 mortar shells were launched from Gaza in about 17 attacks towards Israel. These attacks caused property damage, but no deaths. Four were injured as a result of fire started by a rocket launch.

June 1
A rocket was fired early Sunday morning at the Eshkol region.  The rocket landed in a field and no casualties were reported.

June 11
A rocket fired from Gaza narrowly missed a main artery in southern Israel as it landed in a nearby dirt field without causing any injuries.

June 14
2 of 3 rockets fired from Gaza fell in the Hof Ashkelon regional council in the afternoon. No injuries or damage were reported.

June 15
In Ashkelon a series of explosions were heard in the evening. 4 rockets were fired from Gaza, 2 of them were intercepted by the Iron Dome. Fragments of the rockets fell across the city. There were no reports of injuries or material damages.

June 16
A rocket from Gaza landed in an open area in the Ashkelon area. No damage or injuries.

June 18
2 rockets fired from Gaza hit into a Sha'ar Hanegev Regional Council community and caused light damage to a structure.

June 19
In the evening a rocket was fired from Gaza. It struck an open field near Sderot. Later again a rocket was fired at the city of Ashkelon. It was successfully intercepted by Iron Dome.

June 20
A Color Red siren alerting residents of a rocket launch from Gaza has been sounded in the Hof Ashkelon area, but the rocket didn't make it outside of the Gaza strip.

June 21
Gaza Militants fired a rocket into direction of Hof Ashkelon Regional Council in southern Israel. No injuries, but damage caused to a road in Hof Ashkelon. In the evening three rockets were fired at the Sdot Negev and Sha'ar HaNegev Regional Councils. All rockets exploded in the open area. No damages or injuries were reported.

June 24
In the early evening Gaza Militants fired several rockets into Southern Israel. Two of the rockets were intercepted by the Iron Dome Missile Defense System, as the rockets would have hit inhabited areas. Targets have been Ashkelon and Sha'ar Hanegev Regional Council. Again a rocket landed in the South, in the Sdot Negev Regional Council. There were light damage, but no injuries were reported.

June 27
In the morning a mortar shell exploded near the border fence between Gaza and Israel. No one was hurt. A military vehicle operating in the area was lightly damaged. In the evening 6 rockets were launched from the Gaza strip. Sirens were heard in many areas to warn for incoming fire. 4 rockets fell in the open field. 2 were intercepted by the Iron Dome anti-missile system, as these rockets would have landed in populated areas of Ashekelon.

June 28
In the evening several rockets were fired from the Gaza strip. 2 rockets struck an industrial factory in Sderot, causing a fire. No one was hurt from any of the rockets, but the factory was burned to the ground. All other rockets exploded in the open area in Sdot Negev.

June 29
4 rockets were fired from Gaza into the South of Israel in the evening. 2 were intercepted by the Iron Dome. 2 fell in open area near the border fence.

June 30
The "Code Red" siren was heard all night. 16 rockets were launched from Gaza in the early morning hours. Most of the rockets landed in open areas of the Eshkol Regional Council region. Some went down in the Sedot Negev Regional Council community. One rocket caused light damage to a home. No people were thought to have been hurt. In the late night Gaza militants fired a rocket at Israel. The rocket landed in the open field in the Eshkol Regional Council. No injuries or damage were reported.

July
In July, the number of rocket attacks launched toward Israel from Gaza increased dramatically. Eighty rockets were fired by Hamas and its allies on 7 July.  On the following day, Israel launched Operation Protective Edge.

August

6 August

7 August

8 August 

During the night at 4:02, Palestinians have fired a rocket into the Eshkol Regional Council hours before the end of the ceasefire,  although Hamas officials have denied the accusations of a rocket being fired

20 August 
168 rockets were launched toward Israel, the highest number since the starting of protective edge operation.

September
September 16
A mortar had been fired from Gaza into an area near Eshkol and Sdot Negev,

October
October 31
A rocket was launched from Gaza into southern Israel without causing harm.

December
December 19
A rocket from Gaza was fired into Israel, exploding in open territory near the Eshkol Regional Council. No injuries or damage were reported. In response, the following day IDF struck a site belonging to Hamas in southern Gaza near Khan Yunis. Israeli Defense Minister Moshe Ya'alon reported that the target was a factory making cement that would be used to build tunnels.

References

Hamas
Islamic Jihad Movement in Palestine
Rocket weapons of Palestine
Terrorist incidents in Israel in 2014
Israeli–Palestinian conflict-related lists
2014 in Israel
Terrorist attacks attributed to Palestinian militant groups
Gaza–Israel conflict
2014 in the Gaza Strip
2014 Israel–Gaza conflict
Palestinian_rocket_attacks_on_Israel